The Honolulu Sharks were a minor league baseball team in the Hawaii Winter Baseball league based in Honolulu, Hawaii. The Sharks name comes from the large number of shark species native to the waters of Hawaii. They played their home games at the Les Murakami Baseball Stadium.

Notable players

 Gabe Kapler (born 1975), major league baseball outfielder and manager, 2021 NL Manager of the Year

 Matt Wieters, drafted by the Baltimore Orioles in 2007 (4x all star, Georgia Tech) played for the Sharks in 2007.

Team Record

References

Baseball teams established in 1993
2008 disestablishments in Hawaii
Baseball teams disestablished in 2008
Defunct Hawaii Winter Baseball teams
Sports in Honolulu
Defunct baseball teams in Hawaii